The Mastinocerinae are a subfamily of phengodid beetles (Phengodidae). It contains mostly Central and South American species. They are also known as "railroad worms".

Genera 
 Akamboja Roza, Quintino, Mermudes & Silveira, 2017, 5 spp.
 Brasilocerus Wittmer, 1963, 9 spp.
 Cenophengus LeConte, 1881, 23 spp.
 Cephalophrixothrix Wittmer, 1976, 3 spp.
 Decamastinocerus Wittmer, 1988, 2 spp.
 Distremocephalus Wittmer, 1976, 11 spp.
 Eurymastinocerus Wittmer, 1976, 8 spp.
 Euryognathus Wittmer, 1976, 2 spp.
 Euryopa Gorham, 1881, 8 spp.
 Howdenia Howdenia Wittmer, 1976, 10 spp.
 Mastinocerus Solier, 1849
 subgenus Mastinocerus Solier, 1849, 18 spp.
 subgenus Paramastinocerus Wittmer, 1976, 8 spp.
 Mastinomorphus Wittmer, 1976, 15 spp.
 Mastinowittmerus Zaragoza-Caballero, 1984, 2 spp.
 Neophengus Wittmer, 1976, 3 spp.
 Nephromma Wittmer, 1976, 2 spp.
 Oxymastinocerus Wittmer, 1963, 9 spp.
 Paraphrixothrix Zaragoza-Caballero, 2010, 1 sp.
 Paraptorthodius Schaeffer, 1904, 3 spp.
 Phrixothrix Olivier, 1909, 17 spp.
 Pseudomastinocerus Wittmer, 1963, 9 spp.
 Ptorthodiellus Wittmer, 1976, 2 spp.
 Ptorthodius Gorham, 1881, 3 spp.
 Spangleriella Wittmer, 1988, 1 sp.
 Steneuryopa Wittmer, 1986, 1 sp.
 Stenophrixothrix Wittmer, 1963, 19 spp.
 Taximastinocerus Wittmer, 1963, 18 spp.

References

Phengodidae